Putney High School is an independent all-girls day school in Putney, London. Often referred to as simply Putney, the school admits students from the ages 4–18. Founded in 1893 it is a member of the Girls' Day School Trust, a union of 26 schools with 19,500 students and 3,500 staff. The school uniform is purple and has always been since a uniform was put in place. On average, in the junior school, there are 48 children in a year, 2 classes in a year and 24 in each class. In the senior school, there are about 25–7 in a class and each year has an intake of about 110, so 4 classes a year.

Location and information
Formerly, there were four houses, Argyll, Cromwell, Fairfax and Pitt then there were three school houses Austen, Bronte and Eliot, named after well-known female authors, all of whom felt that their sex gave them a disadvantage and used pseudonyms when writing. George Eliot lived for a time in Holly Lodge, Southfields, a house within walking distance of the Putney High School site. As of September 2013, the school uses an updated system of four houses, Ferrier, Stark, Hepburn and Burton, named after influential women all of whom were nominated by the students (Kathleen Ferrier, Freya Stark, Audrey Hepburn and Beryl Burton).

The school is situated on Putney Hill, a short walk from East Putney tube station (District Line) and Putney mainline station (Waterloo- Hounslow/Teddington/Windsor/Weybridge). It is well-served by buses, the 93, 14, 39 and 85.

Good Schools Guide
According to the Good Schools Guide, the school maintains a "Positive, friendly but hardworking atmosphere with good balance of sport, art, music, etc. The girls seem fulfilled, confident and happy – well prepared for outside world."

Administration

Senior School

The Headmistress of Putney High is Mrs Suzie Longstaff.

Junior School

The head of the Junior School is Pippa Daverson. This takes in years reception (4–5) to year six (10–11).

Athletics
The school has strong links with Thames Rowing Club. It is strong at sports, especially rowing, lacrosse, netball and athletics. The school also has links with Putney Lacrosse Club. The gymnastics team won the national competition in 2005. In 2018 the school acquired a rowing boathouse on the Putney Embankment, becoming the first ever all girls boathouse on the Thames.

Motto
The school motto is fortiter et recte, which means "boldly and rightly".

Notable alumni

Mary Adshead – artist
Jessica Alexander – actress and model
Kazuko Aso - Japanese charitable worker; hostess for her father, Shigeru Yoshida, first Japanese post-war prime minister, mother of Princess Nobuko and Prime Minister Aso 
Jenny Beavan – Academy Award-winning costume designer
Virginia Bottomley – Conservative Party politician
Camilla Cavendish – journalist
Barbara Crocker - artist and author
Zoe Geall – Associate Fashion Director for Varsity Magazine
Olly Grender – Baroness Grender, Former Head of Communications for the Liberal Democrat Party
Nicola Hicks – sculptor
Emma Komlosy - singer and actress
Ramita Navai – journalist and author 
Sandie Okoro – lawyer, senior vice-president of World Bank Group
Ursula Owen – founder, Virago Press
Melanie Phillips – journalist and author
Olivia Poulet – actress
Joan Rimmer – musicologist
Edina Ronay – fashion designer
Sophie Simnett – actress
Elizabeth Symons, Baroness Symons of Vernham Dean
Sophie Raworth – BBC TV newsreader
Glenys Roberts - author and journalist, long time councillor for London’s West End
Madeleine Wickham – novelist published under the pseudonym of Sophie Kinsella

References

External links

 Putney High Homepage
Profile at the Good Schools Guide
Profile at MyDaughter

Private girls' schools in London
Schools of the Girls' Day School Trust
Private schools in the London Borough of Wandsworth
Member schools of the Girls' Schools Association
Putney